Canterbury Television was an independent television station broadcasting in Canterbury, New Zealand.

The name is synonymous with regional television in New Zealand as it was the name of the first regional broadcaster to operate in New Zealand. CTV produced and screened more than twenty hours of locally based programming every week. It also screened overseas programming from Deutsche Welle and Al Jazeera. It was broadcast from the Sugarloaf transmitter on the Port Hills. The transmitter, on UHF channel 48, was an NEC 2kW transmitter and the radiated EIRP was 25kW.

On 22 February 2011 Christchurch was hit by a 6.3 magnitude earthquake and the CTV Building collapsed killing 16 staff members and destroying all of CTV's equipment. On 18 April 2011 CTV resumed service in a new base location at the Mainland Press building in the Christchurch suburb of Harewood.

As of 18 March 2013, CTV commenced digital free-to-air transmissions on Freeview logical channel 40.  CTV was also on Vodafone Channel 199. The station ceased broadcasting on Friday, 16 December 2016 at midnight. CTV now operates as a web-based platform as of 19 December 2016 under the Star Media brand.

History
In 1999, yet to be signed New Zealand soprano Hayley Westenra performed on CTV. The appearance led to her being signed by Universal Music Group New Zealand.

In 2002, NowTV (formerly known as CHTV) and CTV merged, headquartered into the NowTV Building.

In 2006, CTV was the chief sponsor of the Canterbury United soccer team.

Today in Canterbury, a nightly news programme, started in March 2008.

In late 2008 CTV gained popularity with the New Zealand professional wrestling promotion Impact Pro Wrestling airing IPW Ignition weekly. The first episode premiered on 5 October 2008.

In March 2009, CTV started screening Graham Kerr's Kitchen and Nick Stellino's Cucina Amore, half-hour cooking programmes from the 1990s.

In September 2010, the CTV Building had received superficial damage in the 4 September earthquake, but was "given a clean bill of health" by structural engineers, according to the owners. Nevertheless, it collapsed in the February 2011 earthquake, resulting in the greatest single source of loss of life in that earthquake. The building had been built around 1986 (although reports of the building's construction date vary: Chip Le Grand of The Australian said – possibly confusing it with the older CHTV3 building – 1960; a 1 March 2011 NZPA report said 1991 or shortly before; and a 4 March 2011 New Zealand Herald editorial said 1972).

On 18 April 2011, CTV was back on air at 5.30 pm for the first time since February's earthquake. The station began with a two-hour broadcast of news and then another hour of interviews with people involved in the earthquake recovery. Shows would screen nationwide on Māori Television the day after each CTV broadcast.

On 18 March 2013, CTV joined Freeview, broadcasting from Sugarloaf, Christchurch on Channel 40.  They extended their reach to South Canterbury on 1 June 2013, broadcasting from Cave Hill, Timaru.

CTV was bought by Star Media in August 2015 and relocated to the company's premises in Middleton.

2011 Christchurch earthquake

The six-story CTV Building located at 249 Madras Street, on the Cashel Street corner, collapsed in the 22 February 2011 Christchurch earthquake and CTV lost transmission. CTV's main studios were destroyed and the building's lift cavity, the main part of the structure left upright, caught fire. On 23 February, police decided that the damage was not survivable, and rescue efforts at the building were suspended. Initially more than 100 people were believed to have died in the building. Fire-fighting and recovery operations resumed that evening.
Of the 166 confirmed dead by 12 March 2011, 94 were recovered from the CTV building. Many of the dead and missing were faculty and students at the King's Education school for English language, located on the third floor of the CTV building. King's drew students from Asia and elsewhere. The school was attempting to provide as much information as possible to families.

The Port Hills transmitters were understood to be undamaged. CTV's sister channel VTV (Visitors Television) also ceased broadcasting because of the quake.

CTV's website was still functioning immediately after the earthquake, but was later replaced with this statement:

A coronial inquest into the CTV building's collapse reported back to the Government in December 2012, one month later than expected, finding the building's design was deficient and should not have been approved.

Past presenters
 Sue Wells – host of Susan Sells
 Phil Gifford – Co-host of 'Gifford and Balani'
 Jo Giles – host of 'Shopping with Jo' and 'In Depth' (died in the 2011 Canterbury earthquake)
 Jim Hopkins – host of The Knackered Chef, Jim Hopkins Tonight and A Smattering of Ominions

References

External links

CTV, Canterbury Television
The Story of CTV on the Close Up show http://tvnz.co.nz/close-up/story-ctv-5-49-video-4039315
Impact Pro Wrestling – IPW: New Zealand Pro Wrestling's Leading Promotion
3News, "One of the saddest scenes – Canterbury TV – Video", 23 February 2011
"The Story of CTV" www.stuff.co.nz, 28 February 2011

1991 establishments in New Zealand
Mass media in Christchurch
2011 Christchurch earthquake
Television channels and stations established in 1991
English-language television stations in New Zealand